Roberto Grau (born July 16, 1970 in Mendoza, Argentina) is a retired Argentine rugby union footballer and current coach. He played club rugby in Argentina, South Africa, France and England. He also represented the Argentina national rugby union team on 47 occasions, including appearances at the 1999 and 2003 Rugby World Cups.

Grau played for Liceo Rugby Club in Argentina, Golden Lions in South Africa, US Dax in France, Saracens in England. Starting from 2009, he coached U.R. Cuyo.

External links
La 16 profile
rwc 2003 profile

1970 births
Living people
Sportspeople from Mendoza, Argentina
Argentine rugby union coaches
Argentine rugby union players
Rugby union props
Saracens F.C. players
Argentine people of German descent
Golden Lions players
Argentina international rugby union players
Argentine expatriate rugby union players
Expatriate rugby union players in South Africa
Expatriate rugby union players in England
Expatriate rugby union players in France
Argentine expatriate sportspeople in South Africa
Argentine expatriate sportspeople in France
Argentine expatriate sportspeople in England